Michał Stolarz (born 2 February 1977) is a retired Polish football midfielder.

References

1977 births
Living people
Polish footballers
Hutnik Nowa Huta players
OKS Stomil Olsztyn players
Śląsk Wrocław players
Pogoń Szczecin players
ŁKS Łódź players
Stal Głowno players
Piast Gliwice players
Kmita Zabierzów players
Association football midfielders